Trombone Jazz Samba is an album by jazz trombonist and arranger Bob Brookmeyer featuring bossa nova compositions recorded in 1962 for the Verve label.

Reception

The AllMusic review by Ken Dryden stated: "Bob Brookmeyer was in the studio just a few months after Stan Getz and Charlie Byrd helped to launch the bossa nova craze in the United States with their hit LP Jazz Samba, but this extremely enjoyable LP didn't come close to matching the success of the earlier album; it may be because the valve trombone is not envisioned as a lush melodic instrument by the average jazz listener in comparison to the tenor sax".

Track listing
 "Samba de Orfeu" (Luiz Bonfá) - 4:05
 "Manhã de Carnaval" (Luiz Bonfá) - 4:35
 "Blues Bossa Nova" (Bob Brookmeyer) - 4:09
 "Qual E O Po" (Gerson Goncalves, João Roberto Kelly) - 3:30
 "A Felicidade" (Antônio Carlos Jobim) - 3:12
 "Main Theme from Mutiny on the Bounty" (Bronisław Kaper) - 2:02
 "Chora Tua Tristeza" (Oscar Castro-Neves) - 4:11
 "Colonel Bogey Bossa Nova" (Kenneth J. Alford) - 2:15

Personnel 
 Bob Brookmeyer - valve trombone, piano
Gary McFarland - vibraphone 
Jim Hall, Jimmy Raney - guitar
Willie Bobo-drums, Carmen Costa- cabasa, Jose Paulo - tambourine

References 

1962 albums
Verve Records albums
Bob Brookmeyer albums
Albums produced by Creed Taylor